John Wallis (c.1567–1633)  was an English merchant and politician who sat in the House of Commons from 1621 to 1624.

Wallis was a merchant of King's Lynn and is recorded in 1601 as purchasing a boat for £80. He became mayor of King's Lynn in 1622 after Thomas Snelling the holder of the office died.  In 1624 he was re-elected MP for King's Lynn. He was mayor of King's Lynn again in 1631.

References

English MPs 1621–1622
English MPs 1624–1625
Mayors of King's Lynn
Place of birth missing
Year of birth uncertain
1633 deaths